Syed Muhammad Sibtain Raza is a Pakistani politician who had been a Member of the Provincial Assembly of the Punjab, from July 2018 till January 2023. He was also a Member of the Provincial Assembly of Punjab from August 2018 till May 2022 and from June 2013 till May 2018.

Early life and education
He was born on 28 April 1973.

He has done graduation in law.

Political career

He was elected to the Provincial Assembly of the Punjab as an independent candidate from Constituency PP-260 (Muzaffargarh-X) in 2013 Pakistani general election. He joined Pakistan Muslim League (N) in May 2013.

In May 2018, he announced to quit PML-N and join Pakistan Tehreek-e-Insaf (PTI).

He was re-elected to Provincial Assembly of the Punjab as a candidate of PTI from Constituency PP-273 (Muzaffargarh-VI) in 2018 Pakistani general election.
He was appointed as Parliamentary Secretary for Higher Education Punjab soon after talking oath as MPA and still holds office He de-seated due to vote against party policy for Chief Minister of Punjab election  on 16 April 2022.

References

Living people
Punjab MPAs 2013–2018
1973 births
Pakistan Muslim League (N) politicians
Pakistan Tehreek-e-Insaf MPAs (Punjab)
Punjab MPAs 2018–2023
People from Muzaffargarh
Politicians from Muzaffargarh